Hakeem Ali Mohammad (1906-1988) was an Unani physician in Srinagar, Jammu and Kashmir, India.

Life 
Hakeem Ali was born in Zaina Kadal, Jammu and Kashmir. His father was also an Unani physician. Hakeem Ali was the descendant of Hakeem Abdur Rehman, whose lineage comes from Sheikh Hamza. Originally belonging to the Hindu Kashmiri pandit Raina family, his ancestors were converted to Islam by Mir Syed Ali Hamadani.

Hakeem Ali was married to Sidiqa Begum. The couple had three sons and five daughters. His sons Hakeem Mohammad Tahir and Hakeem Manzoor were high ranking officers in Jammu and Kashmir state administration besides being prominent literary personalities.

Career 
Hakeem Ali got his formal education from Molvi Mohammad Hassan Taqi among others. He got his Unani education from his father Hakeem Habib-Ullah. After completing formal education in Unani medicine, he began his practice initially in Zanina Kadal and later moved to Gojwara, where he lived for the rest of his life. During his lifetime he became president of the Jammu and Kashmir  Tibiyya Conference a chapter of All India Tibbiya Conference and traveled extensively in his quest for spirituality. He was a practicing Sufi who maintained a low profile. He performed Hajj in 1975  and adopted a life of tarik thereafter. He was connected to famous Sufi saint of Kashmir Mirak Shah sahab of Shalimar.
In his early days he was afsar-e-mohalla of his locality in Zaina Kadal and post 1947 was appointed Emergency officer (Halqa Kawdara) for some time during Sheikh Mohammad Abdullah's emergency administration, but his Sufi inclinations weaned him away from politics.

Death
Hakeem Ali died in Gojwara after a brief illness in February 1988. He was buried in his ancestral graveyard near the Bahu-Din Sahib shrine.

References 

Source:Tareek Aqwaam Kashmir, Written by: Mohi-u-din Fauq, 3rd Edition, 12 March 1945

Unani practitioners
20th-century Indian medical doctors
1906 births
1987 deaths
People from Srinagar
Medical doctors from Jammu and Kashmir